Imarda, Ltd. is a privately held multinational corporation that provides in-vehicle electronic networking systems and management support of transportation services, vehicles, and mobile and transient employees. The organisation is headquartered in Auckland, with additional offices in the USA and Sydney, Australia.

History 
Imarda is a privately held company, established in 2007 by Selwyn Pellett, who is the recipient of the 2009 Tait Communications Flying Kiwi Award, presented in recognition of his contributions to growing New Zealand's hi-tech industries. , Pellett serves as the company's CEO. The company was created after the acquisition of Internet-based tracking and messaging company, SmartTrack and telematics hardware company, Prolificx. The organisation is headquartered in Auckland, New Zealand, with additional offices in Shawnee Mission, Kansas; Kent, England; Singapore; Malaysia; and Sydney, New South Wales, Australia. While the company's research and development centres are located in New Zealand and Australia, manufacturing and distribution centres are located in Singapore and Malaysia.

In May 2015 the company merged with International Telematics to form Coretex.

Products and services 
Imarda designs, builds, and manages enterprise grade business automation and Fleet Management Systems (FMS). Research and development focuses on combining mobile hardware devices, cellular data communications, GPS tracking, and internet-based services to create integrated systems for the remote management of mobile vehicles and workers.

The organisation's products include a suite of GPS and GIS fleet management tools and enterprise-level business systems, referred to as the company's i360 FMS Telematics platform. The products collect data from dedicated in-vehicle devices and smartphones.
 i360 Control is a GPS fleet tracking system designed for smaller fleet operators who require entry-level tracking and alerting
 i360 Direct provides all the functionality of i360 Control with the added ability to group vehicles into different fleets
 i360 Drive is designed for the enterprise level fleet operator

References 

Telecommunications companies of New Zealand
Companies based in Auckland
Companies based in Kansas
Companies based in New South Wales
New Zealand companies established in 2007
Telecommunications companies established in 2007